2023 in women's road cycling is about the 2023 women's bicycle races ruled by the UCI and the 2023 UCI Women's Teams.

World Championships

UCI Women's WorldTour

UCI Women's ProSeries

Single day races (1.1 and 1.2)

Stage races (2.1 and 2.2)

Single day races (1.NE)

Single day races (2.NE)

Continental Championships

National Champions

U23 National Champions

Junior National Champions

Champions in UCI Women's teams

References

 

Women's road cycling by year